Silvius Brabo [ˈsɪɫviəz ˈbraːboː] was a mythical Roman soldier who was said to have killed a giant, and by this would have created the name Brabant.

Later this story was also used to explain the name Antwerp ('Antwerpen' in Dutch) which, according to the story, is a derivative of 'handwerpen' (meaning hand throwing). Brabo once killed a giant, called Druon Antigoon, who asked money from people who wanted to pass the bridge over the river Scheldt. When they didn't want to or couldn't pay, he cut off their hand and threw it in the river. Because of this, Brabo also removed the hand of the giant, and threw it into the river.

This mythical story is still shown by the statue in front of the Antwerp City Hall.

References

Antwerp in fiction
Belgian folklore
Belgian legends
Legendary Romans
Fictional soldiers
Legendary Flemish people